Juaneda is a surname. Notable people with the surname include:

David Muntaner Juaneda (born 1983), Spanish track cyclist
Julio Juaneda (1912–?), Argentine weightlifter